The Bula (Păla; , Bola) is a river in the Chuvash Republic and the Republic of Tatarstan, Russia, a left-bank tributary of the Sviyaga. It originates in the Chuvash Republic and falls into the Sviyaga River south of Devlikeyevo.

Major tributaries are the Cheremshan and the Malaya Bula. The maximum mineralization is 700–1000 mg/L. Batyrevo, the administrative center of Batyrevsky District of the Chuvash Republic, is located on the river.

References

Rivers of Tatarstan
Rivers of Chuvashia